Catherine M. "Cathy" Hudgins (born 1944) is a Democratic member of the Fairfax County Board of Supervisors; representing the Hunter Mill district, which includes the town of Reston and town of Vienna. In 1984 she was Virginia's National Committeewoman on the Democratic National Committee; as well as the leader of Virginia's delegation to the 1988 Democratic National Convention.

She worked twelve years in the private sector for AT&T as a programmer, consultant, and analyst.

Hudgins was elected to the Board of Supervisors in November 1999, defeating incumbent Republican supervisor Robert B. Dix, Jr.

In April 2013, Hudgins was diagnosed with noninvasive breast cancer.

References

External links
Fairfax County - Cathy M. Hudgins
Washington Post bio

Living people
Virginia Democrats
Politicians from Pine Bluff, Arkansas
Women in Virginia politics
African-American people in Virginia politics
African-American women in politics
People from Reston, Virginia
George Mason University alumni
University of Arkansas at Pine Bluff alumni
Members of the Fairfax County Board of Supervisors
American computer programmers
American women computer scientists
American computer scientists
AT&T people
1944 births
21st-century American politicians
21st-century American women politicians
21st-century African-American women
21st-century African-American politicians
20th-century African-American people
20th-century African-American women